Karl Walser (8 April 1877, Biel/Bienne, Canton of Bern - 28 September 1943) was a Swiss painter, stage designer, illustrator, muralist, and artist.

References

External links

 
 

1877 births
1943 deaths
People from Biel/Bienne
19th-century Swiss painters
Swiss male painters
20th-century Swiss painters
Swiss illustrators
Muralists
19th-century Swiss male artists
20th-century Swiss male artists